Manifest is Impaled Nazarene's tenth full-length studio album.

Track listing
All Songs Written By Impaled Nazarene, except where noted.
 Intro: Greater Wrath - 01:21 (Repe Misanthrope, Trollhorn)
 The Antichrist Files - 01:23
 Mushroom Truth - 03:39
 You Don't Rock Hard - 02:14
 Pathogen - 03:04
 Pandemia - 01:58
 The Calling - 03:56
 Funeral For Despicable Pigs - 03:33
 Planet Nazarene - 03:51
 Blueprint For Your Culture's Apocalypse - 02:49
 Goat Justice - 02:29
 Die Insane - 03:55
 Original Pig Rig - 03:42
 Suicide Song - 03:26
 When Violence Commands The Day - 03:34
 Dead Return - 05:34

Personnel
Mikaakim (Mika Luttinen): All Vocals
Anttila (Jarmo Anttila): Lead Guitar
Tuomio (Tuomio Louhio): Rhythm Guitar
Arc Basstard (Arc V 666): Bass
Repe Misanthrope: Drums

Production
Produced By Impaled Nazarene & Tapio Pennanen
Recorded, Engineered & Mixed By Tapio Pennanen
Mastered By Mika Jussila

External links
"Manifest" at discogs

2007 albums
Impaled Nazarene albums
Osmose Productions albums